Lac de Pont-de-Salars is a lake in Aveyron, France. At an elevation of 718 m, its surface area is 1.82 km².

Pont De Salars